The Queens University of Charlotte is a private university in Charlotte, North Carolina. It has approximately 2,300 undergraduate and graduate students through the College of Arts and Sciences, the McColl School of Business, the Wayland H. Cato, Jr. School of Education, the James L. Knight School of Communication, and the Andrew Blair College of Health, which features the Presbyterian School of Nursing.  Established in 1857, the university offers 34 undergraduate majors and 66 concentrations, and 10 graduate programs. It is affiliated with the Presbyterian Church (USA).

History

Founded in 1857 as the Charlotte Female Institute, the school was originally at College and 9th streets in what is now Uptown Charlotte. From 1891 to 1896, it was called the Seminary for Girls. In 1896, the Concord and Mecklenburg Presbyteries chartered the Presbyterian Female College. The seminary merged with this new college. In 1912, anticipating the move to the present campus in the Myers Park neighborhood, the school became Queens College.

The name Queens College was adopted for three reasons: at the request of the Alumnae Association to disarm prejudice in deference to other Presbyterian colleges which claimed an equal right to the denominational name; to commemorate Queen's Museum, a classical school established in Charlotte in 1771; and to honor Queen Charlotte of Mecklenburg.  In the aftermath of World War II, Queens admitted its first male students. A co-educational Evening College was established in 1948 that provided instruction for adults. It was the forerunner of the New College, which was inaugurated in 1979 as an undergraduate evening program designed for working adults. In 1995, New College was renamed the Pauline Lewis Hayworth College.

In 1979, the traditional undergraduate liberal arts college at Queens was renamed the College of Arts and Sciences (CAS). It began admitting resident males in 1987 when Queens went co-ed.

In 1989, CAS adopted the innovative Foundations of Liberal Learning program, which is now known as the Core Program in Liberal Arts and is required of all first-year students.

The International Experience Program, now known as the John Belk International Program, was established in 1989. Juniors and seniors participate in a variety of study programs that range from study tours, language programs, a month-long environmental studies program in Yap in Micronesia or a summer-long foreign internship, to semester-long study abroad exchanges in Hong Kong or Ireland. Since its inception, the program has received national recognition from U.S. News & World Report. Queens ranked no. 2 in the country for its "percentage of students who travel abroad" (2009) with close to 90 percent participation. In 2008, the program added study tours to Vietnam and South Africa.

In 1996, the Internship and Career Development Program, also nationally recognized, began requiring a minimum of six credit hours for all students enrolled in the College of Arts and Sciences. The program has been recognized in the past by U.S. News & World Report as one of the leading internship programs in the country; it boasts 100 percent participation from the university's student body.

Queens' first master's degree program, the Master of Business Administration, launched in 1980. Since then, Queens has added the Master of Education (1983); the Executive Master of Business (1990); the Master of Arts in Teaching (1992); the Master of Science in Nursing (1998); the Master of Arts in Organizational and Strategic Communication (1999); the Low-Residency Master of Fine Arts in Creative Writing (2001); the Master of Science in Organization Development (2008) and Master of School Administration (2008).

With the additional master's degree programs, Queens achieved a university level rank in the Carnegie Foundation for the Advancement of Teaching and the U.S. News & World Report. The Board of Trustees voted in the Spring of 2002 to recognize Queens' true university status and changed the institutional name from "Queens College" to "Queens University of Charlotte." The change became official on June 1, 2002.

The university obtained the former Presbyterian Hospital School of Nursing to form the Presbyterian School of Nursing at Queens in 2004. One of the most popular majors at Queens, the program produces the third-largest number of new registered nurses among higher education institutions in North Carolina.

In 2006, the university officially opened its 65-acre Sports Complex at Marion Diehl Park, a planned $15 million project that is a partnership between Mecklenburg County and the university. Additionally, in 2008, Queens opened the Knight School of Communication and Wayland H. Cato School of Education that became its fifth and sixth primary units on its Myers Park campus. The Wayland H. Cato School of Education focuses on undergraduate education and runs graduate programs.

In 2010, the School of Communication was renamed the James L. Knight School of Communication through a naming grant from the John S. and James L. Knight Foundation. The grant initiatives include working to improve digital and media literacy in the Charlotte community.

Daniel G. Lugo assumed the role of Queens' 21st president on July 1, 2019, after the retirement of Dr. Pamela Davies, who led Queens for 17 years.

In 2020, the board of trustees have voted unanimously to rename Burwell Hall, which was named in 1914 after Margaret Anna Burwell, the wife of the Robert Burwell. Burwell was the first head of Queens and the building was renamed because the couple were slaveowners.

Academics

Many of Queens University's students are enrolled in either the Business and Marketing programs (33% of undergraduates) or the Communications and Journalism programs (15% of undergraduates). Rounding out the top three most popular majors are the health professions, which are studied by approximately 10% of the undergraduate population, according to the College Board.

General Education program
Queens University has an undergraduate general education curriculum called the "Queens Advantage". Students join learning communities, where they work together to develop solutions and build connections between their experiences at Queens and the world around them. Learning communities gather small groups of students from diverse backgrounds and interests to collaborate towards common objectives. A learning community that includes students studying history, biology, and communication may collaborate to examine a topic such as sustainability, social justice, or immigration. Within these interdisciplinary environments, the groups explore new concepts, express their voice, and activate higher levels of thinking to evaluate themes and address real-world issues. During their senior year, students weave together all they've learned during Queens Advantage into one culminating experience. When they complete the curriculum, students are able to evaluate approaches to complex problems, integrate learning from multiple contexts, and communicate fluently.

Blair College of Health
The Blair College of Health houses the Presbyterian School of Nursing, Human Service Studies Department, and Kinesiology Department.

Knight School of Communication
The Knight School of Communication was established in 2010 and is the only school of communications in the country to be endowed by the Knight Foundation.  It houses two undergraduate programs (Bachelor of Arts in communication and a Bachelor of Arts in multimedia storytelling) and two graduate programs (Master of Arts in communication and a Master of Arts in communication—online).

McColl School of Business
The McColl School of Business was established in 1993 and is named after Bank of America chairman Hugh McColl, Jr. The school has been accredited by AACSB International since 2007 and offers undergraduate business degrees in accounting, business administration, finance, management and marketing leading to the Bachelor of Business Administration (BBA) degree.  The school is known for its internship program (all students complete internships), its study abroad program (John Belk Study Abroad Program), and its high placement rate for graduating seniors.  The school is home to the McColl School of Business DECA Chapter and the McColl Investment Club.

The McColl School of Business is the home of two graduate programs - Master of Business Administration (MBA) and Master of Science in Organization Development (MSOD). The Flexible MBA enables flexible delivery options through on-campus study or through distance education. Students may elect to follow one mode exclusively or mix and match modes.

Student life

Greek life
Queens University of Charlotte has six sororities.

Sororities
 Alpha Delta Pi: Beta Iota Chapter - chartered in 1931
 Chi Omega: Theta Gamma Chapter - chartered in 1928
 Kappa Delta: Alpha Omicron Chapter - chartered in 1928
 Phi Mu: Gamma Gamma Chapter - chartered in 1929
 Alpha Kappa Alpha: Tau Beta Chapter - chartered in 2009
 Zeta Phi Beta: Sigma Upsilon Chapter - chartered in 2015

Clubs and organizations
Queens University of Charlotte has more than 30 clubs and student organizations, ranging from musical ensembles to nature groups. Politically minded students spar in debate between the College Republicans and College Democrats; aspiring journalists write pieces for the Queens Chronicle; service-minded students travel to Guatemala; and the Campus Union Board plans on-campus activities.

Athletics

Queens University of Charlotte's athletic teams take the identity of the Queens Royals on the field and cheer their teams on via their mascot, Rex. Queens is a member of the NCAA's Division I program nationally; regionally, the Royals participate in the ASUN Conference.

A statue of Rex at the Queens Sports Complex is the largest standing lion sculpture in the world.

Men's sports
Men's athletic teams include baseball, basketball, cheerleading, cross-country, golf, lacrosse, rugby, soccer, swimming, tennis, track & field, volleyball, triathlon, and wrestling.

Women's sports
Women's athletic teams include basketball, cheerleading, dance, cross-country, equestrian, field hockey, golf, lacrosse, rugby, soccer, softball, swimming, tennis, track & field, volleyball, and triathlon.

References

External links

 
 Official athletics website
 Student yearbooks 1937–2007

 
Universities and colleges affiliated with the Presbyterian Church (USA)
Private universities and colleges in North Carolina
Universities and colleges in Charlotte, North Carolina
Former women's universities and colleges in the United States
Educational institutions established in 1857
Universities and colleges accredited by the Southern Association of Colleges and Schools
Presbyterianism in North Carolina
1857 establishments in North Carolina